A by-election was held in the Mount Roskill electorate on 3 December 2016. The seat was vacated following the resignation of Phil Goff after he was elected Mayor of Auckland.

Background
At just under  Mount Roskill has the third-smallest land area among New Zealand's electorates. Following the 2014 boundary changes, it lost New Windsor to the  electorate, but gained areas around Three Kings and Sandringham and retained the communities of Mount Roskill, Lynfield, Wesley, and Hillsborough. About 39% of the usually resident population of Mount Roskill are from the Asian ethnic group – the second-highest percentage of any general electorate in 2013, and over three times the national average (11.8%). Just less than half of the people in the electorate in 2013 were born in New Zealand (49.1%) – the fifth-lowest share in New Zealand. The proportions of those affiliated with Islam (5.9%), and those affiliated with Hinduism (10.5%), are the highest and third-highest in the country respectively. Over two-thirds (67.9%) of people in Mount Roskill stated they had never smoked, the third-highest share among general electorates.

At the 2014 election, Phil Goff (Labour) captured a majority (56.5%) of the 32,976 valid electorate votes cast for candidates in the Mount Roskill electorate. The National Party captured a plurality (42.1%, cf. 47.1% nationally) of the party votes in Mount Roskill, up 2.6 percentage points on its party vote share in 2011. The Labour Party received 35.6% of the party votes, the Green Party received 9.7%, and New Zealand First received 5.3%. No other party gained more than 5% of the party votes. Turnout (total votes cast as a proportion of enrolled electors) in 2014 was 75.0%.

Candidates

The Green Party stated it would not field a candidate in the by-election. Co-leader Metiria Turei said the vote would be closely contested and that the Greens did not want to "play any role in National winning the seat". ACT New Zealand also decided not to stand in the by-election, with leader David Seymour saying they wanted to give National the best possible chance of winning the seat. New Zealand First leader Winston Peters said his party would also not stand a candidate in Mount Roskill. He said that while prospective candidates had come forward, the party intended to focus its resources on the general election in 2017. Perennial candidate Adam Holland, a grandson of former Prime Minister Sidney Holland, announced his intention to run for the seat. He earlier contested the Auckland Mayoralty, which was won by Goff, receiving 1,772 votes (0.45 percent). Ultimately, Holland withdrew and did not stand.

Results

The by-election was won decisively by Labour's Michael Wood.

See also
 2016 Auckland mayoral election
 2017 Mount Albert by-election, on 25 February 2017

References

2016 elections in New Zealand
Mount Roskill 2016
December 2016 events in New Zealand
Politics of the Auckland Region